The Union of Agrarian Parties was a list that contested elections in Greece between 1946 and 1974.

History
The Union first contested national elections in 1946, when it won a single seat in the Hellenic Parliament with 0.7% of the vote.

The party did not contest any further elections.

References

Defunct political parties in Greece
Agrarian parties in Greece
Defunct agrarian political parties